John A. Farrell Stadium is a stadium in West Chester, Pennsylvania. It is primarily used by the West Chester University of Pennsylvania Golden Rams football and track & field teams. The stadium was also the temporary home of the Philadelphia Independence of the Women's Professional Soccer league during their inaugural season. Additionally, Farrell Stadium was home to the Philadelphia Eagles for their summer training camp, from 1980–1995. A statue of Michael Horrocks resides at one endzone of the field. Horrocks, a former Golden Rams quarterback, died 2001 in the September 11 attacks; he was a co-pilot of United Airlines Flight 175.

References

External links
 Philadelphia Independence Will Play 2010 Season At West Chester University's John A. Farrell Stadium
West Chester University's Statue Dedication Ceremony Saturday

College football venues
Philadelphia Independence
Sports venues in Pennsylvania
Women's Professional Soccer stadiums
Soccer venues in Pennsylvania
West Chester University
West Chester Golden Rams football